is a Japanese singer, best known as a member of the pop duo PUFFY, along with Ami Onuki.

Early life and career
She was born in Neyagawa, Osaka, in 1975. She learned that there was a talent search underway in Tokyo. She successfully tried out and was paired with Ami Onuki to form the group PUFFY.

Personal life
From 1999 to 2002 she was married to singer Takanori Nishikawa (better known by his music alias T.M. Revolution). After the Japanese media accused Yoshimura of having an affair, Nishikawa filed for divorce. Yoshimura remarried a long-time friend and businessman on December 31, 2009. On August 1, 2012, Yoshimura gave birth to a baby boy. However, she and the unnamed businessman divorced on December 31, 2013, their fourth anniversary.

Between February and April 2003 she lived in Los Angeles, California and went to school to learn the English language. Yumi speaks Japanese, some English, some Spanish and a little French. She also speaks some Hungarian and Portuguese at the beginning of Hi Hi Puffy AmiYumi.

She has hosted the hit talk show Pa-Pa-Pa-Pa-Puffy alongside Ami Onuki in Japan, which aired from 1999 to 2002.

On November 19, 2004, PUFFY's show Hi Hi Puffy AmiYumi began airing on Cartoon Network in the United States. She is voiced by Grey DeLisle in her animated form and she herself appears in the show's live action segments.

She starred as Dendou-Jitensha in the 2002 film Mohou-han (Copycat Killer).  She also starred as Ryoko Tajima in the 2004 film Inu to arukeba: Chirori to Tamura (Walking the Dog) and as Nozomi Akai in the horror film The Neighbor No. 13 (Rinjin 13-gô), which was released in 2005.

Instruments
Yumi can play:
Guitar
Harmonica (Kore ga Watashi no Ikiru Michi)
Piano (2001:a halfway of space odyssey - Watashi no Nozomi)
Timpani (Jet Tour '98 - Ai no Shirushi)
Saxophone (Cosmic*Wonder)

Solo songs

Yumi has also sung several solo songs:

AmiYumi
Nagaiki Shitene (I Want You to Live a Long Time)

Solo Solo
Tennen no Beauty (Natural Beauty)
Kyouki na Futari (Perfect Couple)
Hanabi (Fireworks)
V-A-C-A-T-I-O-N
Sorenarini (Hold Out As Long As You Can)
Ai no Aura (Aura of Love)
Watashi no Nozomi (My Hope)

Jet-CD
Tetsugaku (Philosophy)

The Hit Parade
Hi-Teen Boogie (Late-Teens Boogie)

Fever*Fever
Nannari to Naru Deshou (Anything can become a habit)

Spike
This is the Song of Sweet Sweet Season When Cherry Garcia Blossoms Bloom

Splurge
Rakuda no Kuni (Camel Country, Cameland)

Solo single

On 2 July 1997, each member of PUFFY released their own solo single before their original solo album, Solo Solo was released on the 6 August 1997.

Track listing
V-A-C-A-T-I-O-N
Kyouki na Futari (Perfect Couple)
V-A-C-A-T-I-O-N (Original Karaoke)
Kyouki na Futari (Original Karaoke)

References

External links
 
 
 Puffy AmiYumi World

1975 births
Living people
Puffy AmiYumi members
People from Neyagawa, Osaka
Sony Music Entertainment Japan artists
Musicians from Osaka Prefecture
21st-century Japanese women singers
21st-century Japanese singers
21st-century women guitarists